The Baltacı corps ( means "a person skilled with an axe", from balta: "axe", i.e., "woodcutter" or "halberdier") was a palace guard of the Ottoman Empire. It may also refer to:

People
 Baltacı Mehmet Pasha (1662–1712), Ottoman Grand Vizier (1704–1706, 1710–1711)

Places

 Baltacı, Dicle, a village in the district of Dicle, Diyarbakır Province, Turkey
 Baltacı, Kastamonu, a village in the district of Kastamonu, Kastamonu Province, Turkey
 Baltacı Mehmet Paşa, Osmancık, a village in the district of Osmancık, Çorum Province, Turkey

See also
 Baltacha, a derived name